This electoral calendar 2009 lists the national/federal direct elections held in 2009 in the de jure and de facto sovereign states and their dependent territories. Referendums are included, although they are not elections. By-elections are not included.

January
 12 January: Malta, President (by the parliament)
 18 January: El Salvador, Parliament
 25 January: Bolivia, Constitutional referendum
 30 January: Somalia, President (by the parliament)
 31 January: Iraq, Governorate Councils

February
 8 February: Turkmenistan, Parliament ( Round)
 8 February: Liechtenstein, Parliament
 8 February: Switzerland, Referendum on freedom of movement within the European Union
 10 February: Israel, Parliament
 12 February: French Polynesia, President (by the parliament)
 15 February: Venezuela, Constitutional referendum

March
 3 March: Federated States of Micronesia, Parliament
 8 March: North Korea, Parliament
 12 March: Antigua and Barbuda, Parliament
 15 March: El Salvador, President
 18 March: Azerbaijan, Constitutional referendum
 21 March: Slovakia, President ( Round)
 22 March: Macedonia, President ( Round)
 29 March: Montenegro, Parliament
 29 March: Mayotte, Status referendum

April
 4 April: Slovakia, President ( Round)
 5 April: Macedonia, President ( Round)
 5 April: Moldova, Parliament
 9 April: Algeria, President
 9 April: Indonesia, Parliament
 16 April: India, Parliament ( Round)
 19 April: Haiti, Senate ( Round) (12 of 30 seats)
 19 April: Northern Cyprus, Parliament
 22 April: South Africa, Parliament
 23 April: India, Parliament ( Round)
 25 April: Iceland, Parliament
 26 April: Andorra, Parliament
 26 April: Ecuador, President and Parliament
 30 April: India, Parliament ( Round)

May
 3 May: Panama, President and Parliament
 6 May: South Africa, President (by the parliament)
 7 May: India, Parliament ( Round)
 9 May: Maldives, Parliament
 10 May: New Caledonia, Parliament
 13 May: India, Parliament ( Round)
 16 May: Kuwait, Parliament
 17 May: Lithuania, President
 17 May: Switzerland, Referendum
 17 May: Comoros, Constitutional referendum
 19 May: Malawi, President and Parliament
 20 May: Cayman Islands, Parliament and constitutional referendum
 20 May: Moldova, President ( Round) (indirect)
 23 May: Germany, President (indirect)
 24 May: Mongolia, President
 31 May: South Ossetia, Parliament

June
 2 June: Greenland, Parliament
 3 June: Moldova, President ( Round) (indirect)
 4–7 June: European Union, European Parliament
 7 June: Denmark, Act of Succession referendum
 7 June: Luxembourg, Parliament
 7 June: Lebanon, Parliament
 12 June: Iran, President
 21 June: Haiti, Senate ( Round) (12 of 30 seats)
 21–22 June: Italy, Electoral law referendum
 28 June: Albania, Parliament
 28 June: Argentina, Legislative
 28 June: Guinea-Bissau, President ( Round)

July
 5 July: Bulgaria, Parliament
 5 July: Mexico, Legislative
 8 July: Indonesia, President
 12 July: Republic of the Congo, President
 18 July: Mauritania, President
 23 July: Kyrgyzstan, President
 25 July: Kurdistan Region, Parliament and President
 26 July: Guinea-Bissau, President ( Round)
 29 July: Moldova, Parliament
 31 July – 21 August: New Zealand, Referendum

August
 4 August: Niger, Constitutional referendum
 20 August: Afghanistan, President
 30 August: Gabon, President
 30 August: Japan, Parliament

September
 1–2 September: Vanuatu, President (indirect)
 8 September: Montserrat, Parliament
 12 September: Turkey, Constitution Referendum
 14 September: Norway, Parliament
 16 September: Switzerland, Federal Council (indirect)
 20 September: Macau, Legislative
 25 September: Aruba, Parliament
 27 September: Germany, Parliament
 27 September: Portugal, Parliament
 27 September: Switzerland, Referendum

October
 2 October: Republic of Ireland, Treaty of Lisbon referendum
 4 October: Greece, Parliament
 16 October: Botswana, Parliament
 20 October: Niger, Parliament
 25 October: Tunisia, President and Parliament
 25 October: Uruguay, President ( Round), Parliament and Referendum
 26 October: Marshall Islands, President (indirect)
 28 October: Mozambique, President and Parliament

November
 5 November: Falkland Islands, Legislative Assembly
 7 November: Northern Mariana Islands, Governor ( Round) and Legislative
 10 November: Moldova, President ( Round) (indirect)
 22 November: Romania, President ( Round) and Referendum
 23 November: Northern Mariana Islands, Governor ( Round)
 25 November: Saint Vincent and the Grenadines, Constitutional referendum
 27–28 November: Namibia, President and Parliament
 29 November: Equatorial Guinea, President
 29 November: Honduras, President and Parliament
 29 November: Switzerland, Referendum
 29 November: Uruguay, President ( Round)

December
 6 December: Bolivia, President and Parliament
 6 December: Comoros, Parliament ( Round)
 6 December: Romania, President ( Round)
 7 December: Moldova, President ( Round) (indirect)
 12 December: Abkhazia, President
 13 December: Chile, President ( Round) and Parliament
 18 December: Dominica, Parliament
 20 December: Comoros, Parliament ( round)
 27 December: Uzbekistan, Parliament
 27 December: Croatia, President ( Round)

 
Political timelines of the 2000s by year